This is a list of the top three to five major lakes per region, with links to more detailed region lists of lakes. A "major" lake is defined as that which is the largest by area, depth, volume, or cultural and/or environmental significance.

Africa

Great Lakes of Africa

 Lake Albert (Mobuto-Sese-Seko)
 Lake Chad
 Lake Edward
 Lake Fianga
 Lake Kariba
 Lake Kivu
 Lake Tana
 Lake Mweru
 Lake Nasser (Lake Nubia in Sudan)
 Lake Nyasa (Lake Malawi)
 Lake Tanganyika
 Lake Turkana (Lake Rudolf or Rudolph)
 Lake Victoria shared between Kenya, Uganda and Tanzania.

Lists by country

Algeria

Angola

Benin

Botswana

Makadikadi Basin
Lake Ngami

Burkina Faso

Cameroon

 Lake Awing
 Lake Bambili
 Lake Bamendjing
 Lake Bankim
 Lake Barombi
 Lake Edip
 Lake Kendall
 Lake Lagdo
 Lake Mbakaou
 Lake Monoun
 Muanenguba Lakes (Twin Lakes)
 Lake Nyos
 Lake Oku
 Lake Wum

Cape Verde

Central African Republic

Chad

Comoros

Democratic Republic of the Congo

Republic of the Congo

Djibouti

Lake Assal

Egypt

Equatorial Guinea

Eritrea

Eswatini

Ethiopia

Gabon

The Gambia

Ghana

 Lake Volta
 Lake Bosomtwe

Guinea

Guinea-Bissau

Ivory Coast

Kenya

Lesotho

Liberia

Libya

Madagascar

 Lake Alaotra
 Lake Bedo
 Lake Itasy
 Lake Ihotry
 Lake Kinkony
 Lake Tritriva
 Lake Tsimanampetsotsa
 Lakes Manambolomaty

Malawi

 Lake Chilwa
 Lake Malawi

Mali

Mauritania

 Lac de Mâl

Mauritius

Morocco

Mozambique

 Cabora Bassa Lake

Namibia

Niger

Nigeria

 Kainji Lake
 Oguta Lake
 Asejire Lake

Rwanda

São Tomé and Príncipe

Senegal

Seychelles

Sierra Leone

Somalia

South Africa

South Sudan

Sudan

 Roseires Reservoir
 Lake No
 Lake Nubia (southern reaches of Lake Nasser)

Tanzania

Togo

Tunisia

Uganda

Zambia

Zimbabwe

Antarctica
There are hundreds of lakes deep below the ice of Antarctica.

 Basalt Lake
 Lake Brownworth
 Don Juan Pond
 Parochlus Lake
 Penny Lake
 Lake Pewe
 Lake Vanda
 Lake Vida
 Lake Vostok
 Lake Whillans

Asia

International lakes of Asia
 Pangong Tso

 Lake Baikal – Lake Baikal is located in Siberia in southeastern Russia, just north of Mongolia.
 Caspian Sea – Situated between Asia and Europe and fed by the Volga and Ural Rivers in the north, the Caspian Sea is nevertheless somewhat salty in its central and south portions.

 Aral Sea – Also in far-western Asia, just east of the Caspian Sea, the Aral Sea straddles the boundary between Kazakhstan and Uzbekistan. The Aral Sea is shrinking due to evaporation and diversion for irrigation (among other factors) and what remains (only 10% of its former size) is now almost totally polluted by fertilizer runoff, Soviet weapon testing residue and industrial projects, leading to it being called "one of the planet's worst environmental disasters".
 North Aral Sea
 South Aral Sea

 Dead Sea – Located on the border of Israel and Jordan.

 Lake Khanka

Lists by country

Afghanistan

 Gowd-e-Zereh

Armenia

Azerbaijan

Bahrain

Bangladesh

 Kaptai Lake

Bhutan

Brunei

 Cypt

Cambodia

 Tonlé Sap

China

 Dongting Lake
 Poyang Lake
 Qinghai Lake
 Lake Tai

Cyprus

East Timor

Georgia

India

 Avalanche Lake
 Dal Lake
 Emerald Lake
 Chandra Taal
 Nainital Lake
 Sheshnag Lake
 Suraj Tal
 Tso Moriri
 Tsongmo Lake
Chaluk lake
 Chilka Lake
 Shanti Sagara

Indonesia

 Lake Toba

Iran

 Caspian Sea
 Lake Urmia
 Gavkhouni
 Hamun Lake
 Namak Lake
 Bakhtegan Lake
 Maharloo Lake
 Zarivar Lake

Iraq

 Lake Habbaniyah (Hawr al Habbaniyah)
 Lake Milh (Bahr al Milh)
 Lake Tharthar (Buhayrat ath Tharthar)
 Sawa lake

Israel

 Dead Sea
 Sea of Galilee

Japan

 Lake Mashū

Jordan

 Dead Sea

Kazakhstan

 Lake Alakol
 Lake Balkhash
 Chagan Lake
 Kaindy Lake
 Lake Sasykkol
 Lake Tengiz
 Lake Zaysan

North Korea

South Korea

Kuwait

Kyrgyzstan

 Ala Köl
 Besh-Tash Lake
 Chatyr-Kul
 Issyk-Kul
 Jashyl Köl
 Juukuchak Lake
 Kapka Tash Lake
 Kara-Suu Lake
 Köl-Suu
 Költör Lake
 Kölükök
 Kulun Lake
 Kylaköl
 Ökürgön Lake
 Lake Sary-Chelek
 Merzbacher Lake
 Saryköl
 Song Köl Lake

Laos

Lebanon

Malaysia

Maldives

Mongolia

Myanmar

Nepal

 Fewa Lake
 Rara Lake
 Rupa Lake
 Begnas Lake
 Shey phoksundo lake
 Tilicho Lake
 Gosaikunda Lake

Oman

Pakistan

 Attabad Lake
 Ansoo Lake
 Banjosa Lake
 Dudipatsar Lake
 Hanna Lake
 Karambar Lake
 Kundol Lake
 Lulusar Lake
 Mahodand Lake
 Payee Lake
 Pyala Lake
 Shangrila Lake

Philippines

 Laguna de Bay
 Lake Lanao

Qatar

Russia

  Lake Baikal

Saudi Arabia

 Al-Asfar Lake
 Sabkhat Matti

Singapore

Sri Lanka

Syria

 Lake Assad
 Lake Qattinah
 Lake Al-Rastan
 Lake Muzairib
 Zarzar Lake
 Lake Ballouran

Tajikistan

Thailand

Turkey

 Lake Van

Turkmenistan

United Arab Emirates - UAE

Uzbekistan

Vietnam

Yemen

Palestine

 Dead Sea
 Sea of Galilee

Taiwan

 Bitan Lake
 Changpi Lake
 Chengcing Lake
 Chiaming Lake
 Cueifong Lake
 Gugang Lake
 Jinshi Lake
 Lantan Lake
 Liyu Lake
 Longtan Lake
 Meihua Lake
 Milk Lake
 Sun Moon Lake
 Zhongzheng Lake

Europe

International lakes of Europe
 Lake Constance (Austria, Germany, Switzerland; Bodensee)
 Dojran Lake (North Macedonia and Greece)
 Lake Geneva (France, Switzerland; Lac Léman)
 Lake Lugano (Switzerland, Italy)
 Lake Maggiore (Switzerland, Italy; Lago Maggiore)
 Lake Neusiedl (Neusiedler See)/Fertő (Austria, Hungary)
 Lake Ohrid (North Macedonia, Albania; Liqeni i Ohrit)
 Lake Peipsi-Pihkva (Estonia, Russia)
 Lake Great Prespa (Albania, North Macedonia, Greece)
 Lake Small Prespa (Albania, Greece)
 Lake Skadar (Montenegro, Albania; Liqeni i Shkodrës)
 Lake Vištytis (Lithuania, Russia)
 Lago di Lei (an artificial lake created by a dam; the waters are mostly in Italy but the dam is in Switzerland).

Lists by country

Republic of Albania

 Lake Ohrid

Andorra

Armenia

 Lake Sevan
 Lake Lessing

Austria

 Ahornsee

Azerbaijan

 Lake Sarysu
 Lake Ağgöl

Belarus

Belgium

Bosnia and Herzegovina

Bulgaria

 Lake Atanasovsko
 Banderishki Lakes
 Batak Reservoir
 Lake Burgas
 Dospat Reservoir
 Lake Durankulak
 Iskar Reservoir
 Lake Mandrensko
 Lake Pomorie
 Lake Varna
 Seven Rila Lakes
 Lake Srebarna

Croatia

Cyprus

 Larnaca Salt Lake
 Limassol Salt Lake

Czech Republic

Denmark

Estonia

Finland

France

Georgia

Germany

Greece

Hungary

 Lake Balaton
 Lake Tisza
 Lake Velencei
 Lake Hévíz
 Lake Vadkert

Iceland

Ireland

Italy

 Lake Garda

Kazakhstan

Latvia

 Lake Lubāns
 Lake Rāzna
 Lake Engure

Liechtenstein

Lithuania

Luxembourg

Malta

Moldova

Monaco

Montenegro

Netherlands

North Macedonia

Norway

Poland

 Lake Śniardwy
 Lake Mamry
 Lake Łebsko
 Lake Dąbie
 Lake Miedwie
 Lake Jeziorak
 Lake Niegocin
 Lake Hańcza

Portugal

Romania

Russia

San Marino

Serbia

 Lake Palić
 Perućac Lake
 Vlasina Lake

Slovakia

 Morské oko
 Štrbské pleso
 Zemplínska šírava
 Zlaté Piesky
 Blatné
 Jazero

Slovenia

 Lake Cerknica

Spain

 Lake of Banyoles
 El Atazar Dam
 Estanys de Baiau
 Lakes of Covadonga
 Embalse de Navacerrada
 Sanabria Lake Natural Park

Sweden

 Vänern
 Vättern
 Mälaren
 Hjälmaren
 Storsjön

Switzerland

Turkey

Ukraine

United Kingdom

North and Central America

International lakes of North America
Listed in order of occurrence from easternmost border terminus to the westernmost
 Woodland Flowage
 Grand Falls Flowage
 Spednic Lake (part of the Chiputneticook Lakes)
 East Grand Lake (part of the Chiputneticook Lakes)
 North Lake, partly in North Lake Parish, New Brunswick
 Glazier Lake
 Beau Lake
 Lac de l'Est
 Little St. John Lake (Petit lac Saint-Jean)
 Lac Wallace
 Line Pond (Etang Duck)
 Lake Memphremagog a  glacial lake that extends from Vermont into Canada
 Lake Champlain in Quebec in Canada and New York and Vermont in the United States (US)
 Lake Ontario in Ontario, Canada; and New York in the US
 Lake Erie in Ontario in Canada and Michigan, New York, Ohio, and Pennsylvania in the US
 Lake St Clair in Ontario, Canada; and Michigan in the US
 Lake Huron in Ontario in Canada and Michigan in the US
 Munuscong Lake
 Lake George
 Lake Superior in Ontario, Canada; and Michigan, Minnesota, and Wisconsin in the US
 South Fowl Lake
 North Fowl Lake
 Moose Lake, entry point into the Boundary Waters Canoe Area Wilderness
 Mountain Lake (Cook County, Minnesota)
 Rose Lake (Pigeon River)
 South Lake
 North Lake
 Gunflint Lake
 Magnetic Lake
 Clove Lake
 Granite Lake in Minnesota, US, and Ontario, Canada
 Granite Bay
 Gneiss Lake
 Maraboeuf Lake
 Saganaga Lake
 Swamp Lake
 Ottertrack Lake
 Knife Lake
 Carp Lake in Minnesota, US, and Ontario, Canada
 Birch Lake in Minnesota, US, and Ontario, Canada
 Sucker Lake
 Basswood Lake
 Wednesday Bay
 Thursday Bay
 Crooked Lake in Minnesota, US, and Ontario, Canada
 Sunday Bay
 Bottle Lake
 Lac la Croix
 Loon Lake
 Little Vermillion Lake
 Sand Point Lake
 Rainy Lake
 Lake of the Woods in Minnesota, US; Manitoba and Ontario in Canada
 Wilfred's Lake
 Susie Lake
 Osthus Lake
 South Messier Lake
 Hartley Lake
 Boundary Lake in North Dakota, US; Manitoba, Canada 
 Cavalier Lake
 Ross Lake in North Dakota, US, and Manitoba, Canada
 Lake Metigoshe
 Bone Lake
 Line Lake
 Brush Lake in North Dakota, US, and Saskatchewan, Canada
 Salt Lake in northeastern Montana, US; known as Alkali Lake in Saskatchewan, Canada
 Upper Waterton Lake in Alberta, Canada; and Montana, US
 Cameron Lake in Alberta, Canada; and Montana, US
 Frozen Lake
 Lake Koocanusa
 Alden Lake
 Osoyoos Lake
 Ross Lake in Washington, US, and British Columbia, Canada

Lists by country

Antigua and Barbuda

Bahamas

Barbados

Belize

Canada

Turtle Lake (Vancouver Island)
Lake Huron
Lake Superior
Great Bear Lake
Great Slave Lake
Lake Erie
Lake Winnipeg
Lake Ontario
Lake Athabasca
Reindeer Lake
Smallwood Reservoir
Nettilling Lake
Lake Winnipegosis
Lake Nipigon
Lake Manitoba
Lake of the Woods
Caniapiscau Reservoir
Dubawnt Lake

Costa Rica

Cuba

Dominica

Dominican Republic

El Salvador

 Lago de Coatepeque (Coatepeque Lake) 
 Lago De Ilopango (Ilopango Lake)  
 Laguna De Güija (Güija Lake) 
 Laguna Verde
 Laguna de Alegria
 Olomega Lake
 Suchitlán Lake

Grenada

Guatemala

 Lake Atitlan

Haiti

Honduras

 Lake Yojoa

Jamaica

Mexico

 Lake Chapala
 Lake Texcoco
 Lake Catemaco
 Lake Patzcuaro
 Lake Cuitzeo
 Lake Zirahuen

Nicaragua

 Lake Apanás
 Lake Nicaragua (Lake Cocibolca)
 Lake Managua
 Laguna de Apoyo

Panama

 Lago Bayano 
 Gatun Lake

Saint Kitts and Nevis

Saint Lucia

Saint Vincent and the Grenadines

Trinidad and Tobago

United States of America - USA

Crater Lake
Great Salt Lake
The Great Lakes: Lake Superior, Lake Huron, Lake Michigan, Lake Erie, Lake Ontario
Lake Champlain
Lake Okeechobee
Lake Pontchartrain
Lake Tahoe
Lake Winnebago

Oceania

Lists by country

Australia

Federated States of Micronesia

Fiji

Kiribati

Marshall Islands

Nauru

 Buada Lagoon

New Zealand

Palau

Papua New Guinea

Samoa

Solomon Islands

Tonga

Tuvalu

Vanuatu

Wallis and Futuna

South America

International lakes of South America
 Lake Titicaca (in Peru and Bolivia)
 General Carrera Lake (in Chile and Argentina)
 O'Higgins/San Martín Lake (in Chile and Argentina)
 Cochrane/Pueyrredón Lake (in Chile and Argentina)
 Cami/Fagnano Lake (in Chile and Argentina)
 Palena/General Vintter Lake (in Chile and Argentina)
 Lake Viedma (undefined border near the Southern Patagonian Ice Field between Chile and Argentina)

Lists by country

Argentina

Bolivia

Brazil

Chile

Colombia

Ecuador

Guyana

Paraguay

Peru

 Lake Titicaca
 Quñuqqucha

Suriname

Brokopondo Reservoir

Uruguay

Venezuela

 Guri (man-made)
 Lake Maracaibo (sometimes considered a sea)
 Lake Valencia

Former lakes

 Lake Agassiz
 Lake Ballivián
 Lake Hula
 Lake Makgadikgadi
 Lop Nur
 Owens Lake
 Tulare Lake

Extraterrestrial lakes

Titan

See also

List of lakes by area
List of lakes by depth
List of lakes by volume
List of dams and reservoirs
List of international lakes

References

Lakes